Nagarkar is a surname. Notable people with the surname include:

Kiran Nagarkar (1942–2019), Indian novelist, playwright, film and drama critic and screenwriter
Rajashree Nagarkar, Indian performing artist and actress
Ram Nagarkar (born 1995), Indian actor
Sudeep Nagarkar (born 1988), Indian novelist and fiction writer
Suman Nagarkar, Indian actress
Dhruv Nagarkar (born 2012), Indian child actor

Indian surnames
Surnames of Indian origin